This outline of Australia is an overview of and topical guide to various aspects of the country of Australia.

Australia refers to both the continent of Australia and to the Commonwealth of Australia, the sovereign country. 

The continent of Australia, the world's smallest continent, is in the Southern Hemisphere and borders both the Indian Ocean and the Pacific Ocean.

The Commonwealth of Australia comprises the mainland of the Australian continent, the major island of Tasmania, other nearby islands, and various external territories. 

Neighbouring countries are Indonesia, East Timor, and Papua New Guinea to the north, the Solomon Islands, Vanuatu, and New Caledonia to the north-east, and New Zealand to the south-east.

The Australian mainland has been inhabited for at least 50,000 years by Aboriginal Australians. After sporadic visits by fishermen from the north and then European discovery by Dutch explorers in 1606, the eastern half of Australia was later claimed by the British in 1770 and initially settled through penal transportation as part of the colony of New South Wales, commencing on 26 January 1788. As the population grew and new areas were explored, another five largely self-governing Crown colonies were established during the 19th century.

General reference

 Pronunciation: 
 Common English country name: Australia
 Official English country name: The Commonwealth of Australia
 Common endonym(s): Land Down Under  
 Official endonym(s):  
 Adjectival(s): Australian  
 Demonym(s): Australian, Aussie (Colloquially)
 Etymology: Name of Australia
 International rankings of Australia
 ISO country codes: AU, AUS, 036
 ISO region codes: See ISO 3166-2:AU
 Internet country code top-level domain: .au

Geography

Geography of Australia
 Australia is...
 a continent
 a country
 a nation state
 a Commonwealth realm
 a megadiverse country
 Location:
 Australia is a region or subregion of:
 The World (Australia is a continent on the planet Earth)
 Southern Hemisphere and Eastern Hemisphere
 Oceania
 Australasia
 Australia lies between:
 Indian Ocean
 Pacific Ocean
 South Pacific Ocean
 Southern Ocean by some reckonings
 Time zones:
 Australian Eastern Standard Time (EST) (UTC+10), Australian Eastern Summer Time (EDT) (UTC+11)
 Australian Central Standard Time (CST) (UTC+09:30), Australian Central Summer Time (CDT) (UTC+10:30),
 Australian Western Standard Time (WST) (UTC+08)
 Extreme points of Australia (mainland)
 Northernmost Point – Cape York, Queensland (10°41' S)
 Southernmost Point – South Point, Wilsons Promontory, Victoria (39°08' S)
 Westernmost Point – Steep Point, Western Australia (113°09' E)
 Easternmost Point – Cape Byron, New South Wales (153°38' E)
 Highest Point – Mount Kosciuszko  
 Lowest Point – Lake Eyre  
 Land boundaries:  none
 Coastline:  25,760 km
 Population of Australia: 25,694,393 people  (December 2020) – 53rd most populous country
 Area of Australia:   – 6th largest country
 Atlas of Australia
 Surveying in Australia

Environment

Environment of Australia
 Climate of Australia
 Bushfires in Australia
 Climate change in Australia
 Effects of global warming on Australia
 Ecoregions of Australia
 Environmental issues in Australia
 Renewable energy in Australia
 Geothermal power in Australia
 Solar power in Australia
 Wind power in Australia
 Geology of Australia
 National parks of Australia
 Protected areas of Australia
 Wildlife of Australia
 Flora of Australia
 Fauna of Australia
 Birds of Australia
 Mammals of Australia

Geographic features

 Islands of Australia
 Lakes of Australia
 Mountains of Australia
 Volcanoes in Australia
 Rivers of Australia
 Valleys of Australia
 Waterfalls of Australia
 World Heritage Sites in Australia

Regions

 Ecoregions in Australia

Multi-state regions
 Barkly Tableland
 Capital Country
 Eastern states of Australia
 East Coast of Australia
 Lake Eyre basin
 Murray–Darling basin
 Northern Australia
 The Nullarbor
 Outback
 Southern Australia

Administrative divisions

States and territories of Australia

States
  New South Wales
  Victoria
  Queensland
  Western Australia
  South Australia
  Tasmania

Territories

Mainland territories
  Australian Capital Territory
  Northern Territory
  Jervis Bay Territory

External territories
  Ashmore and Cartier Islands
  Australian Antarctic Territory
  Norfolk Island
  Christmas Island
  Cocos (Keeling) Islands
  Coral Sea Islands Territory
  Heard and McDonald Islands

Municipalities

Local government in Australia
 Cities of Australia

Demography

Demographics of Australia

Government and politics

 Form of government: Federal parliamentary constitutional monarchy
 Capital of Australia: Canberra
 Elections in Australia
 1901 – 1972 – 1974 – 1975 – 1977 – 1980 – 1983 – 1984 – 1987 – 1990 – 1993 –  1996 – 1998 – 2001 – 2004 – 2007 – 2010 – 2013
 Australian electoral system
 Compulsory voting
 Preferential voting
 Divisions of the Australian House of Representatives
 Human rights in Australia
 Political parties in Australia
 Liberal Party of Australia
 Australian Labor Party
 National Party of Australia
 Australian Democrats
 Australian Greens
 Political scandals of Australia
 Republicanism in Australia
 Taxation in Australia

Federal government

Government of Australia

Branches of the government

Separation of powers in Australia

Executive branch
 Head of state: King of Australia (King Charles III)
 Head of state's representative: Governor-General (David Hurley)
 Head of government: Prime Minister of Australia (Anthony Albanese)
 Cabinet
 Federal Executive Council

Legislative branch
 Parliament of Australia
 Australian monarch
 Australian Senate
 Australian House of Representatives
 Opposition Leader (currently: Peter Dutton)

Judicial branch

Judiciary of Australia
 High Court of Australia
 Australian court hierarchy
 Constitution of Australia

Military

Australian Defence Force (ADF)
 Command
 Commander-in-chief: Governor-General as the King's representative.
 Minister for Defence of Australia (Richard Marles)

 Forces
 Army of Australia: Australian Army
 Navy of Australia: Royal Australian Navy
 Air force of Australia: Royal Australian Air Force
 Special forces of Australia
 Military history of Australia
 Australian Defence Force ranks

Foreign relations

 ANZUS
 Australia–United States relations
 Australia–New Zealand relations
 Australia–Indonesia relations
 Australia–China relations
 Australia–Japan relations
 Anglo-Australian relations
 Australia and the United Nations

International organisation membership
The Commonwealth of Australia is a member of the:

 Asian Development Bank (ADB)
 Asia-Pacific Economic Cooperation (APEC)
 Association of Southeast Asian Nations (ASEAN) (dialogue partner)
 Association of Southeast Asian Nations Regional Forum (ARF)
 Australia Group
 Australia-New Zealand-United States Security Treaty (ANZUS)
 Bank for International Settlements (BIS)
 Colombo Plan (CP)
 Commonwealth of Nations
 East Asia Summit (EAS)
 European Bank for Reconstruction and Development (EBRD)
 Food and Agriculture Organization (FAO)
 Group of Twenty Finance Ministers and Central Bank Governors (G20)
 Informal social partnership (MIKTA)
 International Atomic Energy Agency (IAEA)
 International Bank for Reconstruction and Development (IBRD)
 International Chamber of Commerce (ICC)
 International Civil Aviation Organization (ICAO)
 International Criminal Court (ICCt)
 International Criminal Police Organization (Interpol)
 International Development Association (IDA)
 International Energy Agency (IEA)
 International Federation of Red Cross and Red Crescent Societies (IFRCS)
 International Finance Corporation (IFC)
 International Hydrographic Organization (IHO)
 International Labour Organization (ILO)
 International Maritime Organization (IMO)
 International Mobile Satellite Organization (IMSO)
 International Monetary Fund (IMF)
 International Olympic Committee (IOC)
 International Organization for Migration (IOM)
 International Organization for Standardization (ISO)
 International Red Cross and Red Crescent Movement (ICRM)
 International Telecommunication Union (ITU)

 International Telecommunications Satellite Organization (ITSO)
 International Trade Union Confederation (ITUC)
 Inter-Parliamentary Union (IPU)
 Multilateral Investment Guarantee Agency (MIGA)
 Non-Aligned Movement (NAM) (guest)
 Nuclear Energy Agency (NEA)
 Nuclear Suppliers Group (NSG)
 Organisation for Economic Co-operation and Development (OECD)
 Organisation for the Prohibition of Chemical Weapons (OPCW)
 The Pacific Community (SPC)
 Pacific Islands Forum (PIF)
 Paris Club
 Permanent Court of Arbitration (PCA)
 South Asian Association for Regional Cooperation (SAARC) (observer)
 South Pacific Regional Trade and Economic Co-operation Agreement (Sparteca)
 United Nations (UN)
 United Nations Conference on Trade and Development (UNCTAD)
 United Nations Educational, Scientific, and Cultural Organization (UNESCO)
 United Nations High Commissioner for Refugees (UNHCR)
 United Nations Integrated Mission in Timor-Leste (UNMIT)
 United Nations Mission in the Sudan (UNMIS)
 United Nations Relief and Works Agency for Palestine Refugees in the Near East (UNRWA)
 United Nations Truce Supervision Organization (UNTSO)
 Universal Postal Union (UPU)
 World Customs Organization (WCO)
 World Federation of Trade Unions (WFTU)
 World Health Organization (WHO)
 World Intellectual Property Organization (WIPO)
 World Meteorological Organization (WMO)
 World Tourism Organization (UNWTO)
 World Trade Organization (WTO)
 World Veterans Federation
 Zangger Committee (ZC)

Law and order

Law of Australia
 Citizenship
 Cannabis in Australia
 Constitution of Australia
 Crime in Australia
 Law enforcement in Australia
 National law enforcement agencies
 Australian Border Force (ABF)
 Australian Federal Police (AFP)
 Australian Competition & Consumer Commission (ACCC)
 Australian Crime Commission (ACC)
 Australian Securities & Investments Commission (ASIC)
 Australian Taxation Office (ATO)
 Regional law enforcement agencies – the following policing agencies are regulated by their respective State or Territory Government and are highly visible:
 Australian Capital Territory Police
 New South Wales Police Force
 Northern Territory Police
 Queensland Police Service
 South Australia Police
 Tasmania Police
 Victoria Police
 Western Australia Police

State and territory governments
 Governors of the Australian states
 Parliaments of the Australian states and territories
 Premiers of the Australian states
 Government of New South Wales
 Government of Queensland
 Government of South Australia
 Government of Tasmania
 Government of Victoria
 Government of Western Australia
 Government of the Australian Capital Territory
 Government of the Northern Territory

Local government

Local government in Australia

 Local government in Australia

History

 Prehistory of Australia
 Australian archaeology
 European exploration of Australia
 History of Australia (1788–1850)
 History of Australia (1851–1900)
 History of Australia (1901–1945)
 Australian Federation
 Australia in World War I
 Australia in World War II
 Stolen Generations
 History of Australia since 1945
 Constitutional history of Australia
 Immigration history of Australia
 Postage stamps and postal history of Australia

History of states
 History of New South Wales
 History of Queensland
 History of South Australia
 History of Tasmania
 History of Victoria
 History of Western Australia

Culture

Culture of Australia

 Architecture of Australia
Architecture of Western Australia
Australian architectural styles
 Australian art
Indigenous Australian art
 Cinema of Australia
 Australian cuisine
 Dance in Australia
 Festivals in Australia
 Australian folklore
 Humour in Australia
 Languages of Australia
Australian Aboriginal languages
Australian Aboriginal English
 Australian English
 Australian literature
 Media of Australia
 Television in Australia
 Cinema of Australia
 Music of Australia
 Australian music charts
 Australian country music
 Australian hip hop
 Australian jazz
 Australian rock
 Indigenous Australian music
 Music of immigrant communities in Australia
 National symbols of Australia
 Coat of arms of Australia
 Flag of Australia
 National anthems:
 Official national anthem: Advance Australia Fair
 Royal anthem: God Save the King
 People of Australia
 Australian diaspora
 Australian of the Year
 Prostitution in Australia
 Public holidays in Australia
 World Heritage Sites in Australia
 Theatre of Australia

Economy and infrastructure

Economy of Australia
 Economic rank, by nominal GDP (2007): 14th (fourteenth)
 Agriculture in Australia
 Telecommunications in Australia
 Internet in Australia
 Reserve Bank of Australia
 Companies of Australia
 List of pizzerias in Australia
 List of restaurant chains in Australia
 Currency of Australia: Dollar
 ISO 4217: AUD
 Economic history of Australia
 Energy in Australia
 Energy in Australia
 Energy policy of Australia
 Effects of global warming on Australia
 Garnaut Climate Change Review
 Coal in Australia
 Carbon capture and storage in Australia
 Geothermal power in Australia
 Solar power in Australia
 Wind power in Australia
 Health care in Australia
 Median household income in Australia and New Zealand
 Mining in Australia
 Coal mining in Australia
 Australian Securities Exchange
 Tourism in Australia
 Visa policy of Australia
 Transport in Australia
 Airports in Australia
 Rail transport in Australia
 Road transport in Australia
 Tunnels in Australia
 Water supply and sanitation in Australia

State economies
 Economy of New South Wales
 Economy of Queensland
 Economy of South Australia
 Economy of Tasmania
 Economy of Victoria
 Economy of Western Australia

Education

 Homeschooling and distance education in Australia
 Public and private education in Australia
 Universities in Australia
 Group of Eight

States education
 Education in New South Wales
 Education in Queensland
 Education in South Australia
 Education in Tasmania
 Education in Victoria
 Education in Western Australia
 Education in the Australian Capital Territory Religion and belief systems in Australia 
 Australian Aboriginal religion and mythology
 Irreligion in Australia
 Religion in Australia
 Buddhism in Australia
 Christianity in Australia
 Catholicism in Australia
 Protestantism in Australia
 Hinduism in Australia
 Islam in Australia
 Judaism in Australia
 History of the Jews in Australia
 Sikhism in Australia

Sport

Sport in Australia
 Australia at the Olympics
 Australia at the Commonwealth Games
 Football in Australia
 Soccer in Australia
 Australian rules football in Australia
 Rugby union in Australia
 Rugby league in Australia
 Cricket in Australia
 Golf in Australia
 Field hockey in Australia
 Motorsport in Australia
 Tennis in Australia
 Basketball in Australia
 Netball in Australia
 Swimming in Australia
 Swimming Australia
 List of Australian records in swimming
 Women's swimming in Australia
 Skiing in Australia
 Australian horse racing
 Winter sport in Australia

See also

 Index of Australia-related articles
 List of Australia-related topics
 List of articles about Australia and New Zealand jointly
 Member states of the Commonwealth of Nations
 Members states of the Group of Twenty
 Member states of the United Nations
 Outline of geography
 Outline of Oceania
 List of place names of Dutch origin

References

External links

Detailed map of Australia

 
 
Australia